Laemodonta monilifera is a species of small air-breathing, snails, terrestrial pulmonate gastropod mollusks in the family Ellobiidae.

Distribution 
This species occurs in Japan.

References

External links 

Ellobiidae
Gastropods described in 1854